The King's Avatar  is a 2019 Chinese live-action streaming television series based on the web novel of the same name by Hu Dielan. It stars Yang Yang as the main character. It premiered on Tencent Video on July 24, 2019.

Synopsis
The series depicts a fictional esports scene in China where the story revolves around a multiplayer online video game called Glory. It chronicles the fall and rise of Ye Xiu, a top-tier player of Glory.

Cast

Main

Supporting

Team Xing Xin [Happy]

Team Jia Shi [Excellent Era]

Team Lan Yu [Blue Rain]

Team Wei Cao [Tiny Herb]

Team Ambitions [Tyranny]

Others

Production
The live-action series was first announced in February 2017 via a production conference held by Linmon Pictures; and would be co-produced with Tencent Penguin Pictures. The author of the novel   Hu Dielan was invited to be the overall planner of the series.

On June 13, 2017, Yang Yang was announced as the lead actor in a press conference. In November, Song Zu'er was announced as the female lead Su Mucheng, but backed out in March 2018 due to scheduling conflicts.

The series began filming in April 2018, and wrapped up in September 2018. A Dungeon Fighter Online professional player was engaged to serve as instructor to the cast. The production  embraces a number of technological advances, e.g. motion capture, face capture, and their integration with virtual shooting using Unreal engine for real-time preview.
The voice actors of the donghua were invited to dub the actors in the television series.

Reception
The series was an instant hit among young audiences due to its fresh storyline centered around esports, as well as the stunning visual effects. It won praise from People's Daily as well as several industry professionals for its spiritual focus and creative value.
It attracted more than 3 billion views on Tencent Video, and more than ten million views on overseas market platforms such as WeTV and YouTube.

Soundtrack

Awards and nominations

References

Chinese sports television series
2019 Chinese television series debuts
Esports television series
Television shows based on Chinese novels
Television series by Linmon Pictures
Television series by Tencent Penguin Pictures
2019 Chinese television series endings
Chinese web series
Tencent original programming